Courtin' Wildcats is a 1929 American silent comedy Western film directed by Jerome Storm and produced by and starring Hoot Gibson. It is based on the short story "Courtin' Calamity" by William Dudley Pelley, which had previously been filmed in 1924 as the silent western The Sawdust Trail. It was distributed through the Universal Pictures. The film was a hybrid type with part talking, music, and sound effects sequences.

Cast

Preservation status
A print of Courtin' Wildcats is preserved by the Library of Congress.

References

External links
 
 

1929 films
1920s Western (genre) comedy films
1929 comedy films
American black-and-white films
Films based on works by William Dudley Pelley
Films directed by Jerome Storm
Silent American Western (genre) comedy films
Universal Pictures films
1920s American films
1920s English-language films